San Ignacio Church is a historic Catholic church at 1300 Walter St., NE in Albuquerque, New Mexico.

It was built in 1916 and was added to the National Register in 1979.

References

Churches on the National Register of Historic Places in New Mexico
Roman Catholic churches completed in 1916
Roman Catholic churches in Albuquerque, New Mexico
National Register of Historic Places in Albuquerque, New Mexico
20th-century Roman Catholic church buildings in the United States